FK Sevojno (Serbian Cyrillic: ФК Севојно) was a football club from Sevojno, Užice, Serbia.

History
By middle May in 1950 begins the construction of the copper rolling mill. The workers formed a football team that soon after, on 25 June 1950, played its first unofficial match against neighbouring and future city rivals FK Sloboda Užice. Afterwards, ambitious workers led by the construction executives Mr. Rada Popović and Mr. Raco Jovović officially form a football club on 7 July 1951 initially named "FK Radnički". Its first match takes place on 2 August same year against FK Borac Čačak and despite a minimal defeat by 2–3, a bright future for the club is announced.

In 1952 the club begins competing in the football League of Užice. In its first official match the club achieved a win against FK Zlatibor Čajetina by 2–0. The years after were successful for the club and a series of promotions were achieved. In 1957 the club is promoted to the Kragujevac regional League.

In 1961 the Sports society of Sevojno is formed and the club begins competing under this new name.

In the season 1968–69 the club finishes second in the inter-regional League Užice/Čačak by this achieving promotion to the Second Serbian League (4th national tier). The club spends three seasons playing in this league, but afterwards is relegated and plays in the League of Morava and Šumadija (until 1976–77), regional and inter-regional leagues, until the season 1989–90 when it returns to the Second Serbian League. It only manages to stay one season in that league, afterwards being relegated to the League of Morava and Šumadija where plays all the way until the season 1995–96 when is promoted to the Serbian League West (group Morava) where plays until it reaches promotion to the Serbian First League (second national tier).

It was in 2004 that the club was promoted to the First League by finishing second behind FK Radnički Kragujevac in the Serbian League West. The qualification was not direct, and was achieved through wins against FK Železničar Niš (7–1) and FK Radnički Obrenovac (2–0 and 1–0). In the following seasons the club consolidated its participation in the league and was even close to achieve promotion to the SuperLiga.

The biggest success in club's history is reaching Serbian Cup final in season 2008–09. After beating few Serbian SuperLiga clubs on penalties – Hajduk Kula in 1/16, Borac Čačak in 1/8 and Napredak Kruševac in 1/4, they won 2–1 against Red Star Belgrade in the semi-final played on May 6, 2009. In final, Sevojno Point faced current Serbian champions and Cup holders Partizan Belgrade. Even though they lost the final 3–0 they appeared in the new UEFA Europa League 2009–10, as Serbian Cup runners-up.
They went on to put in a credible performance by a second division team in the UEFA Cup by beating FBK Kaunas and then losing to Lille in the third round 2–0 home and away.

On July 1, 2010, FK Sevojno Point merged with FK Sloboda Užice and they agreed to play under a new name, FK Sloboda Point Sevojno. The terms of the merger were such that the newly merged entity gets Sevojno's leadership and league standing as well as Sloboda's infrastructure (24 November Stadium in Užice being the most important) and assumes historical continuity with FK Sloboda's heritage.

In the 2010–11 season, FK Sloboda Point Sevojno will compete in the Superliga – Serbia's highest tier league competition. Same season newly created club which took name FK Sloboda, started to play from the lowest tier of Serbian league system.

Sevojno in Europe

Notable players
Players that have more, or around, 100 league matches, and the ones that played for the national team.
 Mile Andrić
 Branko Božović
 Darko Micevski
 Radoš Bulatović
 Goran Ćosić
 Nenad Divac
 Njegoš Goločevac
 Lazar Jovičić
 Radenko Kamberović
 Radivoje Manić
 Marko Pavićević
 Predrag Popović
 Savo Raković
 Radan Šunjevarić
 Vladislav Virić
For more information on players with article, see :Category:FK Sevojno players.

Stadium
FK Sevojno Point played on the "Kraj Valjaonice" Stadium. The stadium holds 4,350.

Notes

External links
 Official website

 
Football clubs in Serbia
Association football clubs established in 1950
Association football clubs disestablished in 2010
Defunct football clubs in Serbia
1950 establishments in Serbia
2010 disestablishments in Serbia